In baseball, a force is a situation in which a baserunner is compelled (or forced) to vacate their starting base (time-of-pitch base) and try to advance to the next base. 
When a runner is forced to advance to a base, they are forced out if an opponent with possession of the ball reaches that base before they do. Runners are no longer forced to advance to the next base if any runner behind them on the basepaths is put out.

A runner at first base is always forced to attempt to advance to second base when the batter becomes a runner.  Runners at second or third base are forced only when all bases preceding their time-of-pitch base are occupied by other baserunners and the batter becomes a runner.

Explanation
A forced runner's  force base is the next base beyond his time-of-pitch base.  Any attempt by fielders to put a forced runner out is called a  force play.

The forced runners can be compared to bumper cars. If with a runner on first, the batter hits a ground ball, the batter may run to first, and since two runners are not allowed to stay on one base at one time, the runner who was on first, to begin with is now bumped by the advancing batter over to second. If there already was a runner on second as well, that runner is now bumped over to third, and so on. If a runner is bumped over to the next base by the advancing batter or by another runner who was bumped by the advancing batter, then that runner is considered to have been forced to advance to the next base. If however, with a runner on third, for example, the batter hits a ground ball, the batter may run to first, but the runner on third, not having been bumped by the batter, is not forced to advance and can stay where they are if they elect to do so.

Force plays, or force outs, are one of the two ways to get a runner out on a ground ball. For a fielder to get a forced runner out, he needs only to retrieve the hit ball and (1) step on the base in question before the forced runner gets there, or (2) tag that runner before the runner gets there. For example, with a runner on first, the batter hits a ground ball to the second baseman. The runner on first is being forced over to second by the advancing batter. Since this is a force play, the second baseman, once he catches the ball, needs only to step on second base or tag the runner before the runner gets there in order to get him out. A tag out, or tag play, the second way to get a runner out on a ground ball, involves an unforced runner and is much more difficult to execute.

Removing the force
A force on a runner is "removed" when the batter or a following runner (in other words, any runner behind him on the basepaths) is put out.  This most often happens on fly outs—on such, the batter-runner is out, and the other runner(s) must return to their time-of-pitch base, known as tagging up. It also occasionally happens when a sharply hit ground ball is fielded by the first baseman, who then quickly steps on first base to put out the batter-runner. This removes the requirement that the runner already on first must advance to second base; he cannot be forced out by a defensive player holding the ball while touching second base, and the runner can try to escape from a rundown by returning to first base.

For force outs resulting from neighborhood plays, see the highlighted link.

Scoring on force outs

No run can be scored during the same continuous playing action as a force out for the third out, even if a runner reaches home plate before the third out is recorded.  As a result, on a batted ball with two outs, fielders will nearly always ignore a runner trying to score, attempting instead to force out the batter or another runner. For example, suppose there are runners on first and third with one out. The batter hits a ground ball to the second baseman. The second baseman, seeing a forced runner on first heading his way, retrieves the ball and steps on second to get him out on the force out for the second out of the inning. If the runner on third had meanwhile run home and touched home plate, his run would count, if the batter-runner reached first base safely. But suppose the same play happened with two players out. The second baseman, seeing the forced runner on first heading his way, retrieves the ball and steps on second to get him out on the force play for the third out of the inning. If the runner on third had meanwhile run home and touched home plate, that run would not have counted. Note that the second baseman, tagging such a forced runner coming from first for the third out, also prevents scoring by the speedy runner from third as this tag is considered a force out (any out, tag, or touching the force base, on a forced runner is a force out).

An appeal play may also be a force play; for example, with runners on first and third bases and two out, the batter gets a hit but the runner from first misses second base on the way to third.  After a proper appeal, this runner will be called out.  This is a force out because the runner was out for failing to touch a base to which he was forced; this force out is the third out and thus the run does not score.  However, most appeals are not forced plays, because appeals usually do not involve a forced runner.

Tagging up is not equivalent to being forced
It is not a force out when a runner is put out while trying to tag up after a caught fly ball. Because this out is similar to a true force out, in that the runner can be put out by a fielder possessing the ball at the base that the runner needs to reach, there is a widespread misconception that this out is a force out. But it is not, which means the run would count if it scored before the third out is made on a runner trying to tag up.

See also
Fielder's choice
Double play
Fourth out
Run out, a similar event in cricket

References

External links
Baseball Almanac Rules.

Baseball rules
Baseball terminology
Baseball plays